Gonzalez Spur is a prominent rock spur  long that extends east-southeast from the  high Goldich Crest in the Olympus Range of the McMurdo Dry Valleys, Antarctica. It was named by the Advisory Committee on Antarctic Names (2004) after Angel Gonzalez, Manager of the U.S. Antarctic Resource Center, U.S. Geological Survey, 1996–2004.

References

Ridges of Victoria Land
McMurdo Dry Valleys